The Australian Technical Advisory Group on Immunisation (ATAGI) is a technical advisory group of the Australian Government. As part of the Department of Health, ATAGI provides advice to the Minister of Health on the immunisation program of Australia and related matters, including the strength of evidence pertaining to existing, new, and emerging vaccines.

Roles
ATAGI's role

 The main role of ATAGI is to provide advice on the administration of vaccinations related to the National Immunisation Program (NIP) to the Minister of Health
 Advisory on the ongoing immunisation research or the most needed areas 
 furnish industry supports with pre-accommodation guidance for likely entries to the Pharmaceutical Benefits Advisory Committee (PBAC) on immunisation viability and use in Australia. ATAGI guidance should be looked for before support making an accommodation to the PBAC
 Discussion with pertinent associations to create the Australian Immunisation Handbook
 Discussion with significant associations in carrying out vaccination arrangements, strategies and immunization security

Members
ATAGI's members are appointed by Minister of Health (including a Chair and Deputy Chair) through an informal nomination process for a term of four years. ATAGI comprise voting members (including a Chair and Deputy Chair) and six ex-officio members, which are:
 Assistant Secretary, Immunisation Branch, (Office for Health Protection) Department of Health 
 Director, Drug Safety and Evaluation, Therapeutic Goods Administration
 Representative from the National Immunisation Committee
 Representative from the Communicable Diseases Network Australia
 Director of the National Centre for Immunisation Research and Surveillance

Voting Members
As of January 2022, ATAGI's voting member are as follows:

Temporary Members
Temporary members may be appointed on a short term basis to provide specific expertise on key topics. Temporary members will be voting members for the term of their appointment to ATAGI.

Meetings 
The standard number of ATAGI meetings is six per year (in February, April, June, August, October and December). These are pre-planned annually, according to the schedules of government and department programmes for the year. However, it is open for ATAGI to organise meetings and consultations at any time, whenever there may be need, on the group's initiative, or at the request of the department.

Recommendations

Advice during COVID-19 pandemic
On 8 April 2021 during the COVID-19 pandemic in Australia, ATAGI met with the Therapeutic Goods Administration (TGA) regarding the recent concerns of blood clots following administration of the Oxford–AstraZeneca COVID-19 vaccine. ATAGI advised the government to use the AstraZeneca vaccine only for people over the age of 50. However on 17 June 2021, after cases of thrombosis with thrombocytopenia syndrome (TTS) and two deaths, ATAGI changed their previous advice and only recommended the AstraZeneca vaccine for those over 60 years-of-age. The Commonwealth government followed their advice.

COVID-19 vaccines for 12 to 15 years old individuals
On 27 August 2021, Pfizer Comirnaty vaccine has been recommended by ATAGI for adolescents aged 12 years or older after the TGA had extended the registration of the vaccine for administration to those age groups on 23 July 2021.

Booster dose for severely immunocompromised
On 8 October 2021, ATAGI recommends the government start the rollout of booster dose (3rd dose) of COVID-19 vaccines for severely immunocompromised persons aged 12 years old or older. The preferable vaccines for booster dose are the mRNA vaccine (Pfizer or Moderna).  
A 2 to 6 months interval for the booster dose from the date of second dose of the previous vaccine is recommended by ATAGI.

Booster dose for adult Australians
On 28 October 2021, ATAGI recommends the Comirnaty (Pfizer) vaccine as a booster dose for Australians aged 18 years or older, regardless of the previous COVID-19 vaccine used. The booster dose should be taken after six months from the second dose of the last course vaccination. However, the booster dose is not mandatory but recommended for high priority groups like aged care facilities,  Aboriginal and Torres Strait Islanders, healthcare workers, people with underlying medical conditions, and people at increased occupational risk of COVID-19.

See also 
 Therapeutic Goods Administration
 National Immunization Technical Advisory Group (the global concept)
 Advisory Committee on Immunization Practices, immunisation advisory committee in the (United States)
 Joint Committee on Vaccination and Immunisation, immunisation advisory committee in the (United Kingdom)
 National Advisory Committee on Immunization, immunisation advisory committee in (Canada)
 Standing Committee on Vaccination, immunisation advisory committee in Germany

References

Commonwealth Government agencies of Australia
Medical and health organisations based in Australia
National agencies for drug regulation
Regulation of medical devices
Life sciences industry
Regulatory authorities of Australia